Radio Nepal is the state-owned Radio broadcasting organisation of Nepal. It was established 2 April 1951. Radio Nepal airs programs on short wave, medium wave (AM) and FM frequencies.

Regular broadcasts consume sixteen hours every day, including two hours of regional broadcasts. Public holidays feature an additional two hours. FM Kathmandu, the first FM channel covering Kathmandu valley and adjoining areas, was started in 1995 in Singha Durbar, Kathmandu.

On 19 May 2016, An environmental song, Melancholy was recorded by 365 renowned Nepali singers and musicians in a single day at Radio Nepal studio.

In 2016 Radio Nepal had six medium wave relay stations, one shortwave relay station, and 20 FM relay stations. Broadcasts are available online.

History
In 1951, Radio Prajatantra was transferred to Kathmandu at Singha Durbar by Tarini Prasad Koirala, where it took the name Radio Nepal and started regular broadcasting at April 2, 1951. A 250-watt short wave transmitter was used. Initially daily transmission lasted 4 hours and 30 minutes.

On April 2, 1994, regional centers began regional broadcasting services. 

The Radio Nepal Broadcasting Act was enacted in 2014.

Stations

Gallery

References

Mass media companies of Nepal
1951 establishments in Nepal
State media